The Battle of Smolensk was the first major battle of the French invasion of Russia. It took place on 16–18 August 1812 and involved about 45,000 men of the Grande Armée under Emperor Napoleon I against about 30,000 Russian troops under General Barclay de Tolly. Napoleon occupied Smolensk by driving out Prince Pyotr Bagration's Second Army. The French artillery bombardment burned the city to the ground. Of 2,250 buildings, 84% were destroyed with only 350 surviving intact. Of the city's 15,000 inhabitants, about 1,000 were left at the end of the battle inside the smoking ruins. With over 15,000 casualties, it was one of the bloodiest battles of the invasion.

Prelude

Vitebsk operation
The Russian First Western Army under General Michael Andreas Barclay de Tolly slipped away from Vitebsk on 27 July after an inconclusive fight against Emperor Napoleon, avoiding a general engagement. Napoleon was frustrated by his inability to bring the Russian army to battle and lingered at Vitebsk until 12 August to reform his Grande Armée and wait for stragglers to catch up. General Jean-Andoche Junot replaced King Jérôme as commander of the Westphalian VIII Corps and the Corps joined Napoleon's main army on 4 August near Orsha.

French situation
After five weeks of non-stop operations, the main 375,000-man strike force available to Napoleon had been reduced to 185,000 men by a host of factors. 90,000 troops under Marshal Nicolas Oudinot and Generals Laurent de Gouvion Saint-Cyr, Jean Reynier and Victor de Fay de La Tour-Maubourg had been detached for various missions. Russian forces had inflicted thousands of combat losses on Napoleon's main army, but the primary cause in the reduction of his force was strategic consumption—the need to garrison cities, towns, fortresses and forward supply depots.

Rapid forced marches and the inability of supply wagon trains led to high incidences of desertion and tens of thousands of losses to hunger and disease, most notably dysentery. The scorching July heat reduced the availability of water supplies. Huge numbers of cavalry horses and transportation horses and oxen had died due to a lack of grazing areas and the inability of the wagons to carry enough fodder.

Russian plan

The loss of vast stretches of Russian territory to the advancing French led to a crisis and shift in power in the Russian high command. An aggressive "Russian" faction around Prince Pyotr Bagration called for an immediate, all-out attack against Napoleon. They were supported by Czar Alexander I and the bulk of the officer corps. The "foreign" faction around Barclay de Tolly, composed mostly of officers of German extraction, advocated the continuation of the present policy of delay and withdrawal to dilute Napoleon's striking power. Under strong pressure from above and below, including threats of force, Barclay agreed to an offensive on 6 August. Ignorant as to French dispositions, Barclay intended to outflank what he presumed to be the isolated corps of Viceroy Eugène de Beauharnais near Rudnia, destroy it, and inflict further losses on the French as they came to Eugéne's aid.

Barclay advanced on Rudnia and Poryeche on 7 August. Count Matvei Platov's Cossacks imposed a sharp defeat on General Horace Sébastiani's cavalry near Inkovo the same day, inflicting 600 French casualties. On 8 August, Barclay received false intelligence that Eugène's corps was at Poryeche and reoriented half of his army to face north. Platov was directed to rejoin Barclay's army and Bagration was to move to Vidra. Bagration disobeyed his orders, fearing French Marshal Louis-Nicolas Davout's threat to his left flank. He declared his army was hungry and sick and moved to Smolensk. Barclay failed to stop him, merely adjusting his own forces to compensate. On 11 August, Barclay stayed put and engaged only in outpost fighting with French cavalry under Neapolitan King Joachim. On 12 August, Barclay's scouts found Poryeche empty and he directed Platov to reconnoiter the French movements. The Russian offensive had failed due to disagreements among the generals, Barclay's inactivity and pointless marches that lost the Russians time they could not recover.

French plan

Napoleon had expected a Russian offensive and saw in it a great opportunity to envelop and annihilate the Russian army. He directed Marshal Jacques MacDonald to cross the Daugava to help out Oudinot's force and ordered Oudinot and Saint-Cyr to attack Prince Peter Wittgenstein's 20,000-strong corps to prevent it from assisting Barclay. Napoleon came up with what became known as the Smolensk maneuver, a masterful operation designed to outflank Barclay from the south, cut off the Russians from Moscow and destroy the isolated Russian army, thus bringing the war to an end.

The action at Inkovo on 7 August was seen by Napoleon as heralding an immediate Russian attack. Worried, he deployed his army in a defensive posture around III Corps. By 10 August, Barclay's glacial slowness of operations had convinced Napoleon that the threat had passed. He proceeded with his maneuver. Vitebsk was garrisoned with a force of 3,800 men, which later grew to 7,000, to protect the French lines of communications. Napoleon did not know Barclay's exact location and was acting on instinct. The Grande Armée would advance in two huge columns commanded by Napoleon and Davout. Napoleon's column consisted of Joachim Murat's cavalry, the Imperial Guard, III Corps and IV Corps. It would cross the Dnieper at Rosasna. Davout's column would cross at Orsha, composed of I Corps, V Corps and VIII Corps. This giant force would advance east along the left bank of the Dnieper, swing north to cut the Smolensk-Moscow road and annihilate the isolated Russians. Latour-Maubourg's cavalry would attack down the Dnieper as a diversion. Napoleon's deployment remained hidden from the Russians due to a thick cavalry screen under Generals Emmanuel de Grouchy, Étienne de Nansouty and Louis-Pierre Montbrun. French engineers under General Jean Baptiste Eblé erected four pontoon bridges across the Dnieper near Rosasna on the night of 13–14 August and by daybreak the 175,000-strong Grande Armée was advancing rapidly toward Smolensk.

Battle of Krasnoy
Barclay had left Generalmajor Neverovski's 27th Division to guard Krasnoy, along with some cavalry and artillery. This force of 5,500–7,200 infantry, 1,500 cavalry and 10–14 guns was attacked by 20,000 Frenchmen under Murat and Marshal Michel Ney beginning around 2:30 PM on 14 August. Murat's and Ney's inability to coordinate their infantry-cavalry operations allowed the Russians to get away, at the cost of 1,500–2,300 Russian men and seven guns as well as 500 French casualties. The French had multiple excellent chances to annihilate the Russians but failed to do so.
Neverovski retreated into Smolensk, shutting the gates behind him. The French inability to capture the city on the fly imposed a disastrous delay on their operations. Neverovski requested reinforcements from Bagration and received Nikolai Raevsky's VII Corps, which arrived on the morning of 15 August to defend the southern bank of the Dnieper near Smolensk.

Barclay learned of the French attack from Neverovski. He interpreted Napoleon's offensive as a retreat and prepared to capture Vitebsk. He ordered Bagration to move south along the Dnieper. Bagration refused, pointing out that Smolensk, Neverovski and Raevsky were in grave danger. He then received permission from Barclay to deploy to the Dnieper's southern bank at Katan. Barclay ordered General Dmitry Dokhturov's corps to join Bagration and directed the Smolensk governor to evacuate the city archives. No decisive action was undertaken by Barclay due to uncertainty about Napoleon's locations. Czar Alexander left the army and turned over command of the armies to Barclay, ordering him to defend Smolensk. Barclay decided to rush his and Bagration's men down the road from Vitebsk to Smolensk. With his entire plan of operations hanging in the balance, Napoleon failed to act with sufficient vigor and ordered a 24-hour halt to the advance instead.

Battle

Smolensk, a historic fortress city of 12,600 inhabitants on the main Western invasion route to Moscow, was defended by bastion towers and a thick stone wall. The River Dnieper ran through the middle. The Assumption Cathedral in Smolensk housed one of the most venerated icons of the Eastern Orthodox Church, Our Lady of Smolensk attributed to St Luke, and Napoleon assumed that the Russians would fight outside the city to avoid its destruction. By 16 August, French forces found the city heavily garrisoned by Bagration's troops, further reinforced with the subsequent arrival of Barclay and the main Russian army.

The main battle was fought on 16 August. An initial probing force captured two suburbs but failed to bring the Russians out to battle. Napoleon ordered a general assault with three corps of the Grande Armée, supported by two hundred artillery pieces. This was initially successful, the intense artillery bombardment setting the city on fire. French forces lacked ladders or climbing apparatus to scale the city walls and were under counter fire from Russian artillery. By nightfall, most of the city was burning.

To save the army, Barclay de Tolly abandoned the city destroying all ammunition stores and bridges leaving a small force to hold out for two days to cover his retreat. Around dawn on 17 August, Grande Armée Polish forces successfully breached the walls, and in a few hours the main French forces entered the city. Barclay retained forces on the other side of the river preventing a crossing until the night of August the 18th. The city was almost completely destroyed.

Casualties
Barclay de Tolly claimed 4,000 Russian casualties, while Bogdanovich spoke of 6,000 . Docturov's VI Corps had 16,800 men available prior to the battle but only 6,000 capable of combat at its end, which would mean 10,800 casualties for one Russian corps alone. Prince Eugen of Württemberg's division lost 1,300 men alone. Gaston Bodart gave 6,000. whilst David Chandler estimates them as 12,000–14,000. Alexander Mikaberidze suggests 10,000 Russian casualties at Smolensk.

Napoleon claimed 700 French killed and 3,100–3,200 wounded. His estimate is disputed, as I Corps alone under Lobau lost 6,000. Chandler puts French losses at 10,000, while Mikaberidze also suggested 10,000. Bodart listed 10,000. Russian authors claimed the French losses were as high as 20,000.

Aftermath
The Tsar replaced the unpopular Barclay de Tolly with Kutuzov, who took over the army on 29 August at Tsaryovo-Zaymishche and ordered his men to prepare for battle. Kutuzov understood that Barclay's decision to retreat had been correct, but the Tsar, the Russian troops and Russia could not accept further retreat. His order to search for a battleground eastwards led subsequently to the Battle of Borodino.

Legacy
The Battle of Smolensk is commemorated on the Tomb of the Unknown Soldier in Warsaw, with the inscription "SMOLENSK 17 VIII 1812".

See also
Battle of Smolensk (1941)
French invasion of Russia
List of battles of the French invasion of Russia
Jean-Victor Poncelet

Notes

References

External links
 

Battles of the French invasion of Russia
Battles of the Napoleonic Wars
Battles inscribed on the Arc de Triomphe
Battles involving France
Battles involving Russia
1812 in the Russian Empire
Conflicts in 1812
August 1812 events
History of Smolensk
Smolensk Governorate
Smolensk